{{Infobox ethnic group
| group            = Bisaya People<small>Orang Bisaya</small>
| image            = Bisaya Beaufort.jpg
| caption          = Bisaya Sabah traditional costume
| population       =  140,000
| poptime          = 
| popplace         = : 45,000
: 7,000 (1984): 74,000: 14,000
| langs            = Sabah Bisaya, Malaysian, Brunei Bisaya, English
| rels             = Majority Islam (Sabah and Brunei) and significant minorities of Christianity and Animism (Sarawak)
| related          = Murut, Lun Bawang/Lundayeh, Kadazan-Dusun, Dayaks
}}

Bisaya is an indigenous people from the northwest coast of East Malaysia on the island of Borneo. Their population is concentrated around Beaufort, Kuala Penyu, Menumbok, Sipitang, Labuan Federal Territory, and in Limbang District, Sarawak. The Bisaya tribe has many similarities with the Dusun Tatana tribe, especially in terms of language. It is evident that some of their dialogical language conversations are almost identical if they have a dialogue with each other. Nowadays the Bisaya living in Sabah are Muslims, while the Bisaya living in Sarawak are mostly Christians. In Brunei, they are referred as Dusun, Jati Dusun and Bisaya (one group with the Dusun people of Sabah, Dusunic people). The Bisaya is closely related, linguistically, with the Tatana Dusun of Kuala Penyu, Sabah. 

Origin and etymology
Several theories have been put forward by various researchers regarding the origins of the name of the Bisaya people. Beyer H.O. in 1926, Hester E.D. in 1954 and Harrison in 1956 suggested that the name may have come from the empire of Sri Vijaya (Sonza, 1972). However, in 1960, Eugene Vestraelen (Professor of Linguistics at the University of San Carlos, Cebu City) cautioned that the linguistic derivation of Vijaya would not be Bisaya but Bidaya, or Biraya.

Another theory was suggested by John Carroll:

History

The proto-Bisaya's indigenous people settled in Borneo thousands of years ago. They are skilled in agriculture, particularly in the areas such as paddy planting, ginger, sago, local ginger, tapioca, banana, yam, pepper, coconut. They also hunt animals and breed others, such as chicken, duck, goose, goat, buffalo, cows and many more. Bisaya people are skilled in catching fish either from the river or at sea, and they can hold their breath under water without drowning.

Language

Sabah Bisaya language has 90% intelligibility of Tatana, a Dusun dialect. Bisaya in Sabah also has 58% lexical similarity with dialects of Sarawak Bisaya and 57%–59% with Brunei dialect. Bornean Bisaya belong to the Dusunic group, linguistically.

Music, arts and crafts

The traditional musical instrument consists of Kulintangan, gong, and many of small gongs (cf. Asmahs claim that the Bisaya are supposed to be the best gong musicians). It is as if somebody just beats the gong and everyone-men, women, young and old just starts to dance. All these instruments are used in the wedding ceremony, celebrating very important people etc. Besides the musical items, the Bisayas are able to make good weapons for various purposes.

Culture and tradition

Belief and customs

The majority of the Bisaya in Sabah (Beaufort) are Muslims while the Bisaya in Sarawak (Limbang & Miri) are mostly Christians. Though they treasure their cultural traditions of medicine, marriages, death etc., they don't actually practice it, possibly due to the influence of the religions. Even though they would call the traditional medicine men or women known as Bobolian'' to perform rites in times of illness, most now go to modern medical clinics.

Folk dance
 Liliput dance (Sabah)
 Jipin (Zapin) dance (Sabah)
 Sayau Bagarus dance (grinding some sago trunk to produce sago flakes) (Sabah)
 Mengalawat dance (performances as they stepping on the sago flakes to produce sago juices) (Sabah)
 Mencayau dance (to celebrate victories after defeating the pirates)
 Ugang Bamboo
 Bubu mengalai (Sabah) or bubu dance using some spells such as: Ya Bamban Ya Lukah, Ya Bamban Eh Basari, Main Kita Si Ipar Muda, SiLukah Pandai Menari
 Alai Anding

Folk songs
 Kulintangan Bisaya consist of 27 traditional songs and three berasik songs (spells for curing illness).
 Badaup during paddy harvesting.

Folk games
 Tarik tali, tug of war
 Gasing, spinning top
 Kikit, kite playing
 Lastik / Melastik, slingshot
 Crossbow
 Andiban or spear
 Berambit / Bahambit, arm wrestling
 Martial arts or silat Bisaya with bamboo music

Traditional attire
White shirt, Songket, Tarbus, smoking pipe, Keris, bracelet

Traditional desserts
 Ambuyat
 Kelopis
 Bahulu
 Ketupat
 Kuih Cincin
 Tapai Manis
 Kuih Sapit
 Kuih Jala
 Kuih Penyaram
 Kuih Lamban
 Kuih Gelang

Festivals

Rumbia

The leaves (roun rombia)
The Rumbia's leaves can be woven into a product called Kajang. This product is used for roofing and walling material when building a house or farm hut. Young girls are trained by the older women. The woven Rumbia's leaves need to be dried under the sun. These leaves last for two to three years.

The branch
In the past, the branches of the Rumbia tree were used as walls for a house or hut. The branch can be used to build chicken coops and fences, and the dried branches can be used as a torch. The skin of the branch can be woven into basket, mat, and others.

The trunk
The upper portion of the Rumbia is an edible vegetable that can be eaten raw. This serves as the main vegetable during wedding receptions among the Bisaya community. Then, sago is extracted from the Rumbia's trunk. The skin of the Rumbia tree can be used a firewood, floor for hut, or walls. The trunk can be used as a bridge and can also be made into a boat. Water can be extracted from the roots.

Mibulang
One of their main festivals called Babulang or Mibulang such as buffalo racing is celebrated annually in Batu Danau, Sarawak near the Brunei border.

Notable people
Lajim Ukin - The former Malaysian Minister
 Ruslan Muharam - Member of the Sabah State Legislative Assembly for Lumadan

See also
 Visayan, a major ethnic group of the Philippines with a similar endonym

References

Further reading
Bewsher(1958), Sandin(1971) and Hussain & Newman(1987).
Beccari, Dr. O., NELLE FORESTE DI BORNEO (1902).
Bock, Carl, THE HEAD-HUNTERS OF BORNEO (1882).
Furness, W. H., THE HOME LIFE OF BORNEO HEAD-HUNTERS (1902).
Haddon, E. B., "The Dog-motive in Bornean Art" (JOURN. ANTH. INST., 1905).
Hamer, C. den, IETS OVER HET TATOUEEREN OF TOETANG BIJ DE BIADJOE-STAMMEN.
Hein, A. R., DIE BILDENDEN KUNSTE BEI DEN DAYAKS AUF BORNEO (1890).
Ling Roth, H., THE NATIVES OF SARAWAK AND BRITISH NORTH BORNEO 1896), vol. ii.
Nieuwenhuis, Dr. A. W., IN CENTRAL BORNEO (1900). vol. i.
Nieuwenhuis, Dr. A. W., QUER DURCH BORNEO (1904), vol. i.
Schwaner, Dr. C. A. L. M., BORNEO (1853—54); cf. Ling Roth, vol. ii. pp. cxci to cxcv.
Whitehead, J., EXPLORATION OF MOUNT KINA BALU, NORTH BORNEO (1893).
Selamat Jati; Sejarah Sosio Ekonomi Bisaya (thesis 1990).
Dr. Shafiq Sarawak Museum Journal (1989); "Bisaya Ethnography: A Brief Bisaya Report."
Antarano Peranio; The Structure of Bisaya Society.
Bewsher; Kumpulan tulisan Bewsher (Tuan Busa kajun Bisaya)
Prof. Vernon L. Poritt; "Bapa Guru Bisaya".
Harrisson; Kaitan Bisaya Sarawak, Brunei dan Sabah; "Some origins and attitudes of Brunei Tutong-Belait-Dusun, North Boreneo "Dusun', and Sarawak Bisayan (1958).
http://awangalakbetatar.synthasite.com/
Asmah Hj, Omar (1983), Araneta and Bernard (1960), Hussain Jamil & Newman(187); Bisaya language
R.E. Stubbs (1968); Kegemilangan Bisaya.
St. John (1862) Volume 2; Tulisan yang awal tentang kampung-kampung Bisaya.

Ethnic groups in Brunei
Ethnic groups in Sabah
Ethnic groups in Sarawak